Michael Owens is an American assistant director and visual effects artist. He was nominated for an Academy Award in the category Best Visual Effects for the film Hereafter.

Selected filmography 
 Hereafter (2010; co-nominated with Bryan Grill, Stephan Trojansky and Joe Farrell)

References

External links 

Living people
Place of birth missing (living people)
Year of birth missing (living people)
Visual effects artists
Visual effects supervisors